Lave Knud Broch is a Danish politician and Vice President of the European political alliance, EUDemocrats and substitute member to the European Parliament  for the People's Movement against the EU. Broch is the chair of the Danish UN Association’s Peace and Conflict resolution committee and serves on the executive board. He is widely known in the Danish public for arguing that Denmark should not participate in military actions without a UN mandate. He strongly supports Danish participation in the UN's efforts to promote peace, including establishing a permanent UN peace force.

Broch has connections to a variety of nordic countries, having grown up in Malmö in Sweden in a Danish-Norwegian family. Broch has a Master of Science degree in Political Science from University of Copenhagen. He is also a member of the Danish Social Liberal Party and was a European Parliament candidate for the first time in 1994.

Political views 

Lave Broch is a social liberal, supporting a strong social safety net and prioritising conflict prevention or soft military peace solutions in the world's conflict areas. Also, Lave Broch believes international cooperation is crucial. He is also a strong supporter of the UN, but believes building an EU super state is the wrong path. He argues that the EU has little to no democracy and works for interests that are damaging to peace, welfare and the environment, which is why he thinks Denmark needs to opt out and seek a united Scandinavian/Nordic solution and EFTA membership instead. Lave Broch was also active in the Danish euro referendum and does not believe that kronen (the Danish currency) is tied to the euro. Lastly, Lave Broch is pro ecology and green solutions. For example, sustainable energy over nuclear plants, against EU initiatives that weaken national standards for organic products and the environment.

Conflict resolution
Lave Broch was against the Afghanistan and Iraq wars and warned that it would lead to many civilian casualties and that no sustainable solutions were presented. He was also against the Iraq war because the lack of a UN mandate. The fight against Taliban in Afghanistan was in his view wrong because the western coalition cooperates with suspected war criminals, the civilian losses are too great and the use of torture as a means of interrogation. Which is why Lave Broch argues for undeniable human rights in war and any other circumstances, that cannot be bent in times of distress without consequences.
Lave Broch also argues that EU actions have been damaging in different conflict situations. For instance, he mentions that the EU did not listen to the UN secretary general concerning the recognition of Croatia. Even though the UN secretary general warned that a fast recognition could lead to "the most terrible war" in Bosnia and Hercegovina.
Therefore Lave Broch would rather see issues which are currently solved by military means solved by conflict prevention and arbitration or at the very least a united UN military force, that do not promote special, national or economical interests. The first step is humanitarian aid with food, camps etc. The second step is objective UN observers in conflict zones. And the third step is negotiations.

Lave Broch also opposes the EU's close connections to the European weapons industry. Where accelerating export of weapons is common practice, selling weapons to dictators is common practice, and the EU being the second largest exporter of weapons globally is a fact according to Lave Broch.

Scandinavian cooperation
Lave Broch would rather see a united Scandinavian/Nordic cooperation than EU and he believes that a Nordic league could be an advantage for the development in the world. The united Nordic cooperation would with a combined view on environment, legal policy, foreign policy and trade increase the collected voice of Nordic countries, BT (a daily Danish newspaper) writes about Lave Broch in an article in 2014 after a poll showed that 47% of Denmark would prefer such an arrangement.

Ecology
Lave Broch thinks ecology and sustainable energy is a must if future generations are to survive and in order to protect nature. This is why Lave Broch in a blog on Altinget is troubled by what he sees as the EU's constant invasion of national sovereignty, because in Denmark's case it weakens the current standards for no apparent reason by force undermining the Danish organic brand "Ø-mærke". In order to promote ecology, the national state needs to set standards in their own pace and not by the EU lowering Danish standards.

Notes 

1972 births
Living people